was a Japanese daimyō of the early Edo period, who ruled the Takamatsu Domain. He was the son-in-law of Doi Toshikatsu.

Takatoshi lost rulership of the Takamatsu domain due to an uprising within the fief. The shogunate attaindered his domain, and transferred him to the much smaller Yashima Domain in Dewa Province.

References
Fukuda, Chizuru (2005). Oie-sōdō. Tokyo: Chūōkōron-shinsha.
http://www.asahi-net.or.jp/~me4k-skri/han/shikoku/marugame.html

|-

Daimyo
1611 births
1659 deaths